Mir Kalam Khan Wazir is a Pakistani politician who had been a member of the Provincial Assembly of Khyber Pakhtunkhwa from August 2019 till January 2023. He is a founding member of the Pashtun Tahafuz Movement (PTM).

On 30 August 2020, Mir Kalam survived an assassination attempt by two gunmen as he was traveling in his car in Mirali, North Waziristan after participating in a protest. He lamented that the police had not made any progress in investigating the case.

Early life and education
In 2011, he graduated from the Department of Journalism and Mass Communication at the University of Peshawar.

Political career
Kalam contested 2019 Khyber Pakhtunkhwa provincial election on 20 July 2019 from constituency PK-112 (North Waziristan-II) as an independent. He won the election by the majority of 4,079 votes over the runner up Mir Sadiqullah of Jamiat Ulema-e-Islam (F). He garnered 12,057 votes while Sadiqullah received 7,978 votes.

References

Living people
Pashtun people
People from North Waziristan
Pashtun Tahafuz Movement politicians
Independent MPAs (Khyber Pakhtunkhwa)
Politicians from Khyber Pakhtunkhwa
University of Peshawar alumni
1990 births